Julia Babilon (born 14 July 1984 in Düsseldorf) is a German former professional tennis player. 

In her career, she won five singles titles on the ITF Women's Circuit.

On 20 June 2005, she achieved her career-high singles ranking of world No. 357. On 8 August 2005, she peaked at No. 510 in the WTA doubles rankings.

ITF finals

Singles (5–5)

Doubles (0–2)

External links

 
 

1984 births
Living people
Sportspeople from Düsseldorf
German female tennis players
Tennis people from North Rhine-Westphalia